Marino railway station is a railway station in the townland of Ballycultra in Holywood, County Down, Northern Ireland.

History

The Belfast, Holywood and Bangor Railway opened Marino station on 1 December 1870 on land once inhabited by Benedictine monks.

Due to low passenger numbers, the Ulster Transport Authority closed the station on 11 November 1957. However, under public pressure the UTA reopened it on 4 January 1960.

Service
More frequent trains run at peak times, and the service reduces to hourly in the evenings. Some peak-hour trains pass through Marino without stopping.

On Sundays there is an hourly service in each direction.

References

Railway stations in County Down
Railway stations opened in 1870
Railway stations closed in 1957
Railway stations opened in 1960
Reopened railway stations in Northern Ireland
Railway stations opened by the Ulster Transport Authority (UTA)
Railway stations served by NI Railways
Railway stations in Northern Ireland opened in the 20th century
Railway stations in Northern Ireland opened in the 19th century